Riccardo Barthelemy, also Richard Barthélemy (2 November 1869 – 23 January 1955), was an Italian composer and pianist. He was born in Smyrna. Barthelemy studied in San Pietro a Majella conservatory in Naples. His compositions included songs and stage works. He worked for 14 years as a répétiteur and piano accompanist with famous opera singer Enrico Caruso. In 1912 he won a gold medal in the art competitions of the Olympic Games for his "Marcia trionfale olimpica" ("Olympic Triumphal March").

Works (musical) 
 Caressing butterfly
 Love's wilfulness 
 Adorables tourments
 Triste ritorno
 Chi se nne scorda cchiù?
 Pesca d'ammore
 Sérénade Coquette

Works (literary) 
 Memories of Caruso, translated by Constance S. Camner, with introduction by James Camner. Plainsboro, N.J.: La Scala Autographs, c1979

References

External links
 ABC.net.au Profile
 Caruso singing Barthelemy's composition Triste Ritorno
 Biography of Riccardo Barthelemy

1869 births
1955 deaths
Italian composers
Italian male composers
Olympic gold medalists in art competitions
Medalists at the 1912 Summer Olympics
Olympic competitors in art competitions